The Vilayet of the Archipelago ("Vilayet of the Islands of the Mediterranean Sea") was a first-level administrative division (vilayet) of the Ottoman Empire extant from 1867 to 1912–13, including, at its maximum extent, the Ottoman Aegean islands, Cyprus and the Dardanelles Strait.

The accuracy of the population figures ranges from "approximate" to "merely conjectural" depending on the region from which they were gathered.

History
It was established in 1867 as the successor of the homonymous "Eyalet of the Archipelago", which was established in 1533. Until 1876/7, when it was transferred to the Istanbul Vilayet, the sanjak (sub-province) of Biga was the capital (pasha-sanjak), with the seat of the governor at Kale-i Sultaniye, while the other sanjaks were those of Rodos (Rhodes), Midilli (Lesbos), Sakiz (Chios), Limni (Lemnos), and Kıbrıs (Cyprus).

Cyprus, which had been ruled as an independent mutasarrifate under the direct jurisdiction of the Porte since 1861, was included in the vilayet in April 1868, only to be made a separate mutasarrifate again after 1870. In 1878, Cyprus came under British rule. After the separation of Biga, Rhodes became pasha-sanjak, then Chios in 1880, and then Rhodes again in 1888.

The Dodecanese islands were occupied by Italy during the Italo-Turkish War of 1911–12, and the remaining islands of the eastern Aegean were captured by Greece during the First Balkan War (1912–13), leading to the vilayet's dissolution. Of the Aegean islands, Imbros and Tenedos remained finally under Turkish rule according to the Treaty of Lausanne (1923), while the Dodecanese passed to Greece after World War II.

Administrative divisions

Sanjaks until 1876:
 Sanjak of Biga (pasha-sanjak)
 Sanjak of Rhodes
 Sanjak of Midilli
 Sanjak of Sakiz
 Sanjak of Lemnos
 Sanjak of Cyprus

References

External links
 

Archipelago
History of the Aegean Sea
Ottoman Cyprus
History of Çanakkale Province
History of Rhodes
History of the Dodecanese
1867 establishments in the Ottoman Empire
1913 disestablishments in the Ottoman Empire